Michael or Mike Galloway may refer to:

Michael Galloway (actor) (1925–2010), American actor 
Michael Galloway (politician) (born 1965), Texas politician
Mike Galloway (footballer) (born 1965), Scottish footballer
Mike Galloway (bowls) (born 1966), New Zealand bowls player
Mick Galloway (born 1974), English footballer
Mike Galloway (Shortland Street character), character from the New Zealand soap Shortland Street, played by Oliver Driver